The following is a comprehensive discography of Stryper, an American Christian metal band that originally formed in 1983.

Albums

Studio albums

Live albums

Compilation albums

Singles

Promotional singles

Videos

Tributes 

 Various artists: Sweet Family Music: A Tribute to Stryper (1996)
 Guardian: The Yellow and Black Attack Is Back! (1999)
 Various artists: Isaiah 53:5 (1999)

Music Videos 

 Soldiers Under Command (1986)
 Calling On You (1986)
 Free (1986)
 Honestly (1986)
 All Of Me (1986)
 Always There For You (1988)
 I Believe In You (1988)
 Shining Star (1990)
 Two Time Woman (1990)
 Lady (1990)
 God (2011)
 No More Hell To Pay (2013)
 Sympathy (2013)
 Revelation (2013)
 Pride (2015)
 All Over Again (2015)
 The Valley (2018)
 Sorry (2018)
 Do Unto Others (2020)
 Divider (2020)
 Same Old Story (2022)
 Transgressor (2022)

References

Discographies of American artists
Heavy metal group discographies
Christian music discographies